José Rafael Septién Michel (born December 12, 1953) is a Mexican-American former placekicker in the National Football League (NFL) for the Los Angeles Rams and Dallas Cowboys. He played college football at the University of Louisiana at Lafayette.

Early years
Rafael Septién's father, Carlos, was a professional soccer player in Mexico, who played for the national football team in the 1950 and 1954 FIFA World Cups. He looked to follow in his steps by joining Club América's youth system.

A friend told him that the University of Southwestern Louisiana needed a kicker, so he walked-on to the football team after a tryout. He experienced success from the start of his football career. On October 5, 1974, he kicked a 57-yard field goal, breaking Gerald Landry's 1963 school record. In 1975 and 1976, he received first team Southland Conference honors.

Septién had a remarkable college career, finishing as the University of Louisiana at Lafayette all-time leading kicker and breaking many of the school's records, some of which still stand today:
 Most field goals made in a game: 5 vs. San Jose State University (1974).
 Most points a game: 16 vs. San Jose State University (1974).
 Most field goals attempted in a game: 6 vs. San Jose State University (1974). 
 Most field goals made in a season: 26 (1974).
 Longest field goal: 57 yards vs. Lamar University (1974).
 Most 50+ yard field goals in a season: 4 (1974).
 Most 50+ yard field goals in a career: 9 (1974-1976).
 Most 50+ yard field goals in a season: 4 (1974).
 Most 50+ yard field goals in a game: 2 vs. Lamar University (1974).

Professional career

New Orleans Saints
Septién was selected by the New Orleans Saints in the tenth round (258th overall) of the 1977 NFL Draft, but was waived on August 31.

Los Angeles Rams
On September 16, 1977, Septién was signed as a free agent by the Los Angeles Rams. He made 18 out of 30 field goals; his 60% average ranked fourth best in the NFC and he was named to the All-rookie team. On August 28, 1978, Septién was released after the final pre-season game to make room for third round draft choice Frank Corral, who would go on to have a standout rookie year.

Dallas Cowboys
On August 30, 1978, Septién was signed as a free agent by the Dallas Cowboys, who only had rookie kicker Jay Sherrill on the roster after All-Pro Efren Herrera was traded to the Seattle Seahawks because of a contract holdout. He showed a strong leg for kickoffs and was second in scoring in the NFC. He also played in Super Bowl XIII, making a 27-yard field goal in the third quarter and scoring four PATs, in a 35–31 loss to the Pittsburgh Steelers.

In 1979, Septién finished third in scoring in the NFC. In 1980, he set a franchise record with 59 extra points and was fifth in scoring in the NFC.

In 1981, Septién received All-Pro and Pro Bowl honors at the end of the season, after tying Eddie Murray for the league lead with franchise records for 121 points, 27 field goals, and nine straight field goals made. He became the Cowboys' all-time career field goal leader with 73.

In 1982, Septién became the team's all-time leading scorer, breaking Bob Hayes' previous mark of 456 points. He also made a career-long 53-yard field goal against the Houston Oilers. His 50-yard field goal against the Green Bay Packers tied Garo Yepremian for the second longest in playoff history.

In 1983, Septién broke his own Cowboys' scoring record with 123 points (fifth in the NFL) and his 81.5 percent field goal average broke Herrera's team season mark of 78.3 percent.

In 1985, Septién was limited with a back injury. He missed the second half of a playoff loss to the Los Angeles Rams with a pulled muscle in his right leg.

On April 8, 1987, Septién was indicted after pleading guilty to a charge of indecency with a child and received a 10-year probated sentence. On April 15, he was released by the team and later replaced with Roger Ruzek.

Septién led the Cowboys in scoring in each of his nine seasons with the team, making 162 field goals in 226 attempts and scoring 388 PATs. He left as the fourth most accurate field goal kicker in league history, the eighteenth all-time scoring leader (first in franchise history) with 874 points and his 91 percent field goal accuracy in the playoffs was the best in league history. He was named to the Cowboys' 40th anniversary team in 2000.

Denver Broncos
On June 14, 1989, Septién was signed as a free agent by the Denver Broncos after being out of football for two years, but was waived on August 29.

Personal life
On January 22, 1987, a Dallas County, Texas grand jury indicted Septién on a charge of mishandling a minor. He pleaded guilty on April 8, to a charge of indecency with a child in an agreement with prosecutors that brought him a sentence of ten years of deferred probation and a $2,000 fine. He was released by the Cowboys a week later.

References

1953 births
Living people
Sportspeople from Mexico City
American football placekickers
Louisiana Ragin' Cajuns football players
Los Angeles Rams players
Dallas Cowboys players
National Conference Pro Bowl players
Mexican players of American football
Mexican people of French descent
Mexican expatriate sportspeople in the United States
Expatriate players of American football